Achatinella thaanumi is an extinct species of air-breathing land snail, a terrestrial pulmonate gastropod mollusc in the family Achatinellidae. This species was endemic to Oahu, Hawaii.

References

†thaanumi
Extinct gastropods
Taxonomy articles created by Polbot
ESA endangered species